Gemer is a village and municipality in Revúca District in the Banská Bystrica Region of Slovakia.

Etymology 
János Melich associated Gemer with the Kyrgyz personal name Kemirbaj and old Turkish place name Kömürtag. This theory was adopted also by Lájos Kiss who explains the name from old Turkic kömür: coal.

History 
Important Bronze Age finds have been made in the village. In historical records, the village was first mentioned in 1198 as Gomur (1216 Gumur,  1289 Gemer) as a settlement below the much older Gemer Castle (which was originally a Slavic fortified settlement).  The castle was the capital of Gemer and control point of all the ways for Spiš County.

The settlement below the castle was a royal dominion and in the 14th century it became the capital of Gemer.  It was besieged by the Bohemian condottiere Jiskra in the 15th century and it was pillaged by Turks in the 16th century.  From 1938 to 1945 it belonged to Hungary under the First Vienna Award.

People 
 Czinka Panna

Other residents 
 Samo Chalupka
 István Gyöngyösi
 Ján Kalinčiak
 Janko Kráľ
 Janko Matúška
 Francis II Rákóczi
 Sándor Rudnay
 Sándor Petőfi
 Pavel Jozef Šafárik
 Jonáš Záborský

Genealogical resources
The records for genealogical research are available at the state archive "Statny Archiv in Banska Bystrica, Slovakia"

 Roman Catholic church records (births/marriages/deaths): 1733-1896 (parish B)
 Lutheran church records (births/marriages/deaths): 1730-1895 (parish A)
 Reformated church records (births/marriages/deaths): 1707-1870 (parish B)

See also
 List of municipalities and towns in Slovakia

References

External links 
 https://web.archive.org/web/20080111223415/http://www.statistics.sk/mosmis/eng/run.html 
 http://www.gemer.net
 http://svinica.ou.sk/gemer-sajogomor-o69-uvod.html
 Surnames of living people in Gemer

Villages and municipalities in Revúca District